Kyle Joseph Guy (born August 11, 1997) is an American professional basketball player for the Joventut Badalona of the Liga ACB. He played college basketball for the Virginia Cavaliers as a shooting guard for three years and was named the NCAA Tournament Most Outstanding Player during his junior season before declaring for the draft. In high school, he was Indiana Mr. Basketball and a McDonald's All-American.

Early years

Guy attended Lawrence Central High School in Indianapolis, Indiana. He was a varsity letter-winner all four years at Lawrence Central. On January 18, 2016, Guy was named a McDonald's All-American. After averaging 23.5 points, 5.6 rebounds and 3.7 assists during his senior season, Guy was selected as Indiana's Mr. Basketball. On October 20, 2014, Guy committed to playing college basketball at Virginia, selecting the Cavaliers over offers from schools such as California, Xavier, and Indiana.

College career
On November 22, 2016, in his fourth career college game, Kyle Guy led all players with 20 points and five three-pointers against Grambling State. As a freshman, he averaged 7.5 points per game and shot 49.5 percent from the three-point line.

Guy scored a career-high 29 points in a 76–67 win against VCU on November 17, 2017. He had 22 points, including five three-pointers, in a 76–67 victory over Syracuse on January 10, 2018. In the 2018 ACC tournament, Guy led Virginia to a conference tournament championship, where he averaged 16.7 points per game earning him tournament MVP honors.

Prior to the 2018–19 season, Guy was named to the pre-season watchlists for the Jerry West Award, John R. Wooden Award, and for the Naismith College Player of the Year.

Guy set a new career-high with 30 points against Marshall on December 31, 2018. He recorded his first collegiate double-double with 25 points and 10 rebounds on March 30, 2019, against Purdue in the 2019 NCAA tournament, helping the Cavaliers advance to the program's first Final Four since 1984 in the process. On April 6, 2019, in Virginia's Final Four matchup against Auburn, Guy hit three consecutive free throws with 0.6 seconds left after being fouled on a corner 3 to help the Cavaliers reach their first-ever national championship game. Guy scored 24 points in Virginia's 85–77 overtime win in the championship game, and was named the tournament's Most Outstanding Player.

Professional career

Sacramento Kings (2019–2021)
Kyle Guy was drafted in the 2019 NBA draft by the New York Knicks before being traded to Sacramento. The Kings signed him to a two-way contract on July 7, 2019, to split time between the NBA Kings and their NBA G League affiliate, the Stockton Kings. He scored 42 points for Stockton in a win over the Iowa Wolves on December 1. Guy made his NBA debut on January 10, 2020, against the Milwaukee Bucks. On January 18, Guy scored 37 points and hit seven three-pointers for Stockton in a 147–117 loss to the Oklahoma City Blue.

On February 21, 2021, Guy scored 9 points in 9 minutes off the bench for the Sacramento Kings against the Milwaukee Bucks, on 4-for-5 shooting.

Cleveland Charge (2021)
In August 2021, Guy joined the Golden State Warriors for the 2021 NBA Summer League roster. He debuted with 15 points in 17 minutes off the bench while 4-for-10 from the field, as well as 3-for-7 from three-point range against the Orlando Magic. On September 27, 2021, he signed with the Cleveland Cavaliers, but was waived on October 16. On October 23, he signed with the Cleveland Charge as an affiliate player.

Miami Heat (2021–2022)
On December 30, 2021, Guy signed a 10-day contract with the Miami Heat via the hardship exemption. On January 10, he signed a second 10-day contract. In his first game after signing the 10-day contract, Guy scored 17 points and hit four three-pointers.  On January 17, 2022, Guy signed a two-way contract with the Heat. On March 24, he was waived by the Heat.

Return to the Charge (2022)
On March 28, 2022, Guy returned to the Cleveland Charge.

Career statistics

NBA

|-
| style="text-align:left;"| 
| style="text-align:left;"| Sacramento
| 3 || 0 || 3.3 || .400 || .000 || – || .3 || .3 || .0 || .0 || 1.3
|-
| style="text-align:left;"| 
| style="text-align:left;"| Sacramento
| 31 || 0 || 7.6 || .330 || .283 || .800 || 1.1 || 1.0 || .2 || .0 || 2.8
|-
| style="text-align:left;"| 
| style="text-align:left;"| Miami
| 19 || 0 || 9.8 || .400 || .350 || .667 || .9 || .9 || .4 || .1 || 3.9
|-
| style="text-align:center;" colspan="2"| Career
| 53 || 0 || 8.1 || .361 || .303 || .750 || 1.0 || .9 || .2 || .0 || 3.1

College

|-
| style="text-align:left;"|2016–17
| style="text-align:left;"|Virginia
| 34 || 7 || 18.6 || .439 || .495 || .714 || 1.7 || 1.3 || .4 || .0 || 7.5
|-
| style="text-align:left;"|2017–18
| style="text-align:left;"|Virginia
| 34 || 33 || 32.4 || .415 || .392 || .824 || 2.6 || 1.5 || 1.0 || .0 || 14.1
|-
| style="text-align:left;"|2018–19
| style="text-align:left;"|Virginia
| 38 || 38 || 35.4 || .449 || .426 || .833 || 4.5 || 3.1 || .7 || .1 || 17.4
|- class="sortbottom"
| style="text-align:center;" colspan="2"|Career
| 106 || 78 || 29.1 || .433 || .425 || .806 || 3.0 || 2.1 || .7 || .0 || 12.9

Personal life
Guy's parents are Katy and Tim Fitzgerald (mother and stepfather) and Joe and Amy Guy (father and stepmother). He has five siblings: three brothers and two sisters. Guy's great-grandfather was the commissioner for the Indiana High School Athletic Association and was inducted into the Indiana High School Hall of Fame for basketball and football.

Guy and his wife Alexa married in 2019. Their son was born in September 2021.

References

External links

 Virginia Cavaliers bio
 NBA Draft Profile

1997 births
Living people
All-American college men's basketball players
American expatriate basketball people in Spain
American men's basketball players
Basketball players from Indianapolis
Cleveland Charge players
Joventut Badalona players
Liga ACB players
McDonald's High School All-Americans
Miami Heat players
New York Knicks draft picks
Sacramento Kings players
Shooting guards
Stockton Kings players
Virginia Cavaliers men's basketball players